Skyway Bridge may refer to:

 Burlington Bay Skyway, a bridge near Burlington, Ontario, Canada
 Garden City Skyway, a bridge in St. Catharines, Ontario, Canada
 Chicago Skyway, a bridge in Chicago, Illinois, United States
 Pulaski Skyway, a bridge in Newark, New Jersey, United States
 Sunshine Skyway Bridge, over Tampa Bay in Florida, United States
 Veterans' Glass City Skyway, a bridge in Toledo, Ohio, United States